A list of chapters of the Kappa Kappa Gamma women's fraternity.

Chapters

Canada

United States

Refereces

External links
 Kappa Kappa Gamma's Official International Website

Lists of chapters of United States student societies by society
chapters